Catherine Scott may refer to:

Catherine Scott (athlete) (born 1973), Jamaican athlete
Catherine Amy Dawson Scott (1865–1934), English writer, playwright and poet
Catherine Scott (librarian) (1927–2010), American librarian

See also
Katherine Scott (disambiguation)